Artemether is a medication used for the treatment of malaria. The injectable form is specifically used for severe malaria rather than quinine. In adults, it may not be as effective as artesunate. It is given by injection in a muscle. It is also available by mouth in combination with lumefantrine, known as artemether/lumefantrine.

Artemether causes relatively few side effects. An irregular heartbeat may rarely occur. While there is evidence that use during pregnancy may be harmful in animals, there is no evidence of concern in humans. The World Health Organization (WHO) therefore recommends its use during pregnancy. It is in the artemisinin class of medication.

Artemether has been studied since at least 1981, and been in medical use since 1987. It is on the World Health Organization's List of Essential Medicines.

Medical uses
Artemether is an antimalarial drug for uncomplicated malaria caused by  P. falciparum (and chloroquine-resistant P. falciparum) or chloroquine-resistant P. vivax parasites. Artemether can also be used to treat severe malaria.

The World Health Organization (WHO) recommends the treatment of uncomplicated P. falciparum with artemisinin-based combination therapy. Given in combination with lumefantrine, it may be followed by a 14-day regimen of primaquine to prevent relapse of P. vivax or P. ovale malarial parasites and provide a complete cure.

Artemether can also be used in treating and preventing trematode infections of schistosomiasis when used in combination with praziquantel.

Artemether is rated category C by the FDA based on animal studies where artemisinin derivatives have shown an association with fetal loss and deformity. Some studies, however, do not show evidence of harm.

Side effects 
Possible side effects include cardiac effects such as bradycardia and QT interval prolongation. Also, possible central nervous system toxicity has been shown in animal studies.

Drug interactions 
Plasma artemether level was found to be lower when the combination product was used with lopinavir/ritonavir. There is also decreased drug exposure associated with concurrent use with efavirenz or nevirapine.

Artemether/lumefantrine should not be used with drugs that inhibit CYP3A4.

Hormonal contraceptives may not be as efficacious when used with artemether/lumefantrine.

Pharmacology

Mechanism of action 
Artemether is an artemisinin derivative and the mechanism of action for artemisinins is.

Artemether interact with ferriprotoporphyrin IX (heme) or ferrous ions in the acidic parasite food vacuole, and generates cytotoxic radical species 

The accepted mode of action of the peroxide containing drug involve its interaction with heme (byproduct of hemoglobin degradation), derived from proteolysis of haemoglobin. This interaction results in the formation of toxic oxygen and carbon centered radicals.

One of the proposed mechanisms is that through inhibiting anti-oxidant and metabolic enzymes, artemisinin derivatives inflict oxidative and metabolic stress on the cell. Some pathways affected may concern glutathione and glucose metabolism. As a consequence, lesions and reduced growth of the parasite may result.

Another possible mechanism of action suggests that arteristinin drugs exert their cidal action through inhibiting PfATP6. Since PfATP6 is an enzyme regulating cellular calcium concentration, its malfunctioning will lead to intracellular calcium accumulation, which in turns causes cell death.

Pharmacokinetics
Absorption of artemether is improved 2- to 3-fold with food. It is highly bound to protein (95.4%). Peak concentrations of artemether are seen 2 hours after administration.

Artemether is metabolized in the human body to the active metabolite, dihydroartemisinin, primarily by hepatic enzymes CYP3A4/5. Both the parent drug and active metabolite are eliminated with a half-life of about 2 hours.

Chemistry
Artemether is a methyl ether derivative of artemisinin, which is a peroxide-containing lactone isolated from the antimalarial plant Artemisia annua. It is also known as dihydroartemisinin methyl ether, but its correct chemical nomenclature is (+)-(3-alpha,5a-beta,6-beta,8a-beta, 9-alpha,12-beta,12aR)-decahydro-10-methoxy-3,6,9-trimethyl-3,12-epoxy-12H-pyrano(4,3-j)-1,2-benzodioxepin.
It is a relatively lipophilic and unstable drug, which acts by creating reactive free radicals in addition to affecting the membrane transport system of the plasmodium organism.

References 

Antimalarial agents
Organic peroxides
Sesquiterpenes
Trioxanes
Chinese discoveries
World Health Organization essential medicines
Wikipedia medicine articles ready to translate
Heterocyclic compounds with 4 rings
Methoxy compounds